USS S-12 (SS-117) was a second-group (S-3 or "Government") S-class submarine of the United States Navy.  Her keel was laid down on 8 January 1920 by the Portsmouth Navy Yard.  She was launched on 4 August 1921 sponsored by Mrs. Gordon Woodbury and commissioned on 30 April 1923 with Lieutenant Francis S. Low in command.

Following duty along the northeast coast in 1923 and a visit to Guantanamo, Cuba, from 19 April to 24 April 1924, S-12 resumed duty in New England waters. Sailing from New London, Connecticut, on 15 November 1924, via the Panama Canal and California, she visited Hawaii from 24 April to 25 May 1925, before returning to New London on 12 July. In addition to service in the northeast through 1928, S-12 operated in the Panama Canal area from January through April 1926; visited Kingston, Jamaica, from 20 March to 28 March 1927; and served again in the Panama Canal area from February into April 1928. From 1929 into 1936, S-12 served almost exclusively in the Panama Canal area although she visited Baltimore, Maryland, from 15 May to 5 June 1933, and New London from 15 May to 1 June 1935. Departing Coco Solo on 13 June 1936, S-12 decommissioned at Philadelphia, Pennsylvania, on 30 September 1936.

S-12 was recommissioned on 4 November 1940. Following voyages to Bermuda, Saint Thomas, United States Virgin Islands, and Coco Solo, S-12 operated at St. Thomas from December 1941 into March 1942; in the Panama Canal area from April into June; at Guantánamo from June into December; in the Panama Canal area from that month into May 1944; at Trinidad from May into July; and at Guantánamo from July into 1945. Departing from Guantánamo on 25 March, S-12 was decommissioned on 18 May 1945 at Philadelphia, and was struck from the Naval Vessel Register. She was sold on 28 October that year to Rosoff Brothers of New York City. Resold to Northern Metals Company of Philadelphia, on an unspecified date, she was scrapped.

References 

Ships built in Kittery, Maine
S-12
World War II submarines of the United States
1921 ships